Dumi  is a Kiranti language spoken in the area around the Tap and Rava rivers and their confluence in northern Khotang district, Nepal. It is spoken in the villages such as Makpa, Kharbari, Baksila, Sapteshwor, and Kharmi.

Dialects are Kharbari, Lamdija, and Makpa, with Makpa being the most divergent dialect.

Phonology

See also 
Jalapa, Nepal

References

External links
Himalayan Languages Project

Kiranti languages
Languages of Nepal
Languages of Koshi Province